The Battle of Kulevicha, also known as the Battle of Kulevcha or Kulewtscha, was fought during the Russo-Turkish War, 1828-1829 on 11 June 1829 between Russia and the Ottoman Empire.

Battle
The Russians led by Hans Karl von Diebitsch (German-born general serving the Russian Empire), marched against the Ottomans led by Grand Vizier Reşid Mehmed Pasha (Georgian-born general enslaved as a child by the Ottomans) with the objective of relieving Varna, 40 miles west of the village of Kulevcha. The Russians were victorious as the Turks got trapped in a valley suffering heavy casualties before they managed to withdraw. General Diebitsch then headed towards Adrianople.

The Ottoman force was tasked with various different objectives in Bulgaria, most notably the suppression of Hadjuk revolts, however several other more important duties were tasked to the Ottoman force such as relieving Varna of constant battle and preventing further Russian advancements into Bulgaria.

References

Sources
 

Kulevicha
1829 in the Ottoman Empire
Kulevicha
June 1829 events